The DW Stadium is a stadium in Robin Park, in Wigan, within the Metropolitan Borough of Wigan, Greater Manchester, England. The ground is 100% owned and managed by Phoenix 2021 Limited, owners of Wigan Athletic. Previous to this the stadium was owned 85% by Wigan Athletic with the local council having the remaining 15% share. It is used by Wigan Athletic football club and Wigan Warriors rugby league club, the rugby league club having a 50 years lease on tenancy to play games at the stadium.
Built and opened in 1999, it is named after its main sponsor, DW Sports Fitness. In UEFA matches, it is called Wigan Athletic Stadium due to UEFA regulations on sponsorship.

The stadium architect was Alfred McAlpine. Wigan Athletic and Wigan Warriors moved into it from their long-term homes of Springfield Park and Central Park respectively. International rugby league matches have also taken place at the venue.

Its current capacity is 25,138—seated in four single-tier stands—and its record attendance was on 11 May 2008 when 25,133 people watched Wigan Athletic play Manchester United in the final match of the 2007–08 Premier League season.

History 
The stadium was designed by Alfred McAlpine and completed in August 1999.

Wigan Athletic had spent the previous 67 years playing at Springfield Park, and their first match at the stadium was a friendly against Morecambe, just before the stadium's official opening.

The stadium's inauguration was marked with a friendly between Wigan Athletic and neighbours Manchester United – who were then reigning European champions, Premier League champions and FA Cup holders – with United's manager Sir Alex Ferguson officially opening the stadium.

The first competitive football match there took place on 7 August 1999, with Wigan Athletic facing Scunthorpe United in a Second Division match. Simon Haworth scored twice, including the first competitive goal at the new stadium, as Athletic triumphed 3–0.

Wigan Warriors moved to the stadium a month after it opened, once they had played their final home game of the 1999 regular season at Central Park, which had been the club's home since 1902. After their former ground was sold, the possibility of ground sharing with Bolton Wanderers F.C. at the Reebok Stadium (now University of Bolton Stadium) was presented, but the new stadium in Wigan was chosen instead. Their first game there was a play-off match against Castleford Tigers, which they lost, on 19 September. The Warriors did not lose a competitive match at the stadium in 2001 and 2020.

The first away team to win a competitive football match at the stadium was Wigan Athletic. A first round FA Cup tie against non-league Cambridge City was played there due to City's ground being deemed unsuitable to host the tie. Wigan played in their changed strip and used the away dressing room since it was technically a 'home' game for Cambridge City. A Stuart Barlow brace secured the win for Wigan.

Whilst Wigan Warriors and Wigan Athletic flourished in the new stadium (Wigan Athletic in particular would achieve significant success, rising up the English football pyramid to the Premier League by 2005), Orrell R.U.F.C. did not. Dave Whelan and Maurice Lindsay decided to invest heavily in the club, with the aim of having the club play in rugby union's Guinness Premiership at the stadium. After failing to win 2004's National Division Two, Whelan pulled a large amount of investment from the club, to a more modest £30,000 a year. This was the beginning of Orrell's demise, as players left during the summer of that year and the club were consequently relegated the season after. Ownership eventually passed from Lindsay back to the club's members, but by this point, Orrell had sold their former Edge Hall Road ground to Dave Whelan's company, Whelco Holdings, and therefore had no assets apart from their rebuilt clubhouse following a fire in 2002. Orrell never settled at the JJB Stadium, and were eventually de-professionalised at the end of the 2006–07 season.

On 7 March 2005, Greater Manchester police announced that they would stop policing Wigan Athletic matches at the stadium from 2 April. This move would almost certainly have resulted in the stadium's safety certificate being revoked, effectively forcing the team to play behind closed doors. The move was part of an ongoing dispute between the police force and Dave Whelan surrounding £300,000 in unpaid policing costs. The police's decision would not have affected Wigan Warriors, whose games are stewarded instead of policed. The situation was temporarily resolved on 8 March with both sides reaching an agreement that would allow Athletic to play at the ground until the end of the season. Four months later, Wigan Athletic, facing the prospect of playing their home games in the Premier League in an empty stadium, grudgingly paid the money they owed to the police. The club successfully appealed against the payments in court and won damages from the police.

On 7 September 2008, Wigan Warriors revealed plans to take their Super League Play-Off against Bradford Bulls to a neutral venue. The controversial relocation was forced due to a fixture clash, with a match between football clubs Wigan Athletic and Sunderland to take place less than 24 hours after the Super League match. Whelan, who controlled Wigan Athletic, refused permission for the Warriors to stage their elimination at the stadium, citing concerns over the playing surface. The game was relocated to Widnes Vikings home ground, the Stobart Stadium. In the same season, JJB Sports announced they would not continue to sponsor Wigan Warriors, leaving them without a main shirt sponsor.

The stadium's average attendance has increased significantly since its opening in 1999. The Wigan Warriors' average attendance has increased by 32.5% from its first full season at the stadium in 2000, and Wigan Athletic's average attendance has increased by 181.2% from the 2000–01 season. The highest recorded attendance for a rugby league match is shared between three fixtures; the Wigan Warriors' fixture against St Helens R.F.C. on 25 March 2005; Game 4 of the 2005 Tri-Nations series between Great Britain and Australia on 6 November; and Game 5 of the 2004 Tri-Nations series between Great Britain and Australia on 13 November at 25,004 each. The highest recorded football attendance at the stadium was Wigan Athletic's home fixture against Manchester United on 11 May 2008—the final day of the 2007–08 Premier League season—with 25,133 fans attending. This is the stadium's highest recorded overall attendance to date, and was the match where Manchester United were crowned Premier League champions for that season.

In March 2009, Dave Whelan acquired a chain of fitness clubs from JJB Sports. In the process, Whelan used the business to set up a new venture, DWSportsfitness and announced that the stadium name would change to the DW Stadium in August. Whelan also announced that at the same time the stadium was renamed, its ownership would pass from himself to Wigan Athletic. Concerns about the future of Wigan Warriors were arrested in the same announcement, as Whelan extended the lease on the stadium by 50 years for the rugby league team. Before their match against Leeds Rhinos in July 2009, both clubs were given the opportunity to rename one stand, with the intention of renaming them in honour to a recognised player from each club's history. The rugby league club were granted the East Stand, which they renamed 'The Boston Stand' in tribute to the Welsh  Billy Boston, As Wigan Athletic had spent many years in the lower leagues it was recognised that most of their players were not known, so the West Stand was renamed 'The Springfield Stand' after the club's former ground.

In August 2020 it announced that DW Sports was to enter administration. Later that month it was announced that Frasers Group would buy "certain" assets from DW Sports Fitness for £37m, but would not be using the firm's brand name. If DW Sports ceases to exist, it is unknown who will purchase the naming rights to the stadium.

The match of 8 October 2022 against Cardiff City was controversial when it turned out one goal was bigger than the other. The match went ahead when officials ruled that there was no advantage to either team as they changed ends at half-time. Cardiff won 3-1.

Structure and facilities 

The stadium design is based on cantilevered, prefabricated steel roof and terrace structuring. It is an all-seater arena with a seating capacity of 25,138. The stands are rectangular and both the northern and southern stands have supporting steel girders suspended from beneath the roof. The four stands are of approximately the same height, however the stadium is not totally enclosed, leaving four exposed corners.

The seats are a mixture of both resident teams' main colours of red and blue. The stadium is fully compliant with safety guidelines for a sports ground.

The stadium also has facilities and access for up to 1 fans with disabilities, with facilities for partially sighted fans.

It is mostly made of natural grass, with 2% of the pitch composed of synthetics to provide stability. The ground has irrigation, and an under-heating system to resist icy weather.

Boston Stand (east)
Capacity- 8,238
The Boston Stand, named after Wigan Warriors legend Billy Boston, runs parallel to the western 'Springfield Stand' along the side of the pitch. The Boston Stand is the largest stand in the stadium, holding an electronic scoreboard and has WIGAN spelt out in the seats and has been occupied by the home fans since 2005.

Springfield Stand (west)
Capacity- 6,100
The Springfield Stand, named after Wigan Athletic's former ground Springfield Park contains the stadium's vital facilities; four dressing rooms, benches, a doping control room and a treatment room for the players, as well as four executive boxes, ten radio commentary points and a designated TV studio.

Leam Richardson Stand (South)
Capacity- 5,400
The South Stand was named the “Leam Richardson stand” in November 2021 after Wigan striker Charlie Wyke collapsed during training after suffering a cardiac arrest. Following his discharge from hospital Wyke praised Richardson's swift initiation of CPR saying: "...my life has been saved by the actions of the gaffer [Leam Richardson] and the club doctor Jonathan Tobin...". It is used to seat the home fans behind the goal, opposite to the away fans in the North Stand.

North Stand
Capacity- 5,400
At both Wigan Athletic and Wigan Warriors matches, away supporters are situated in the North Stand behind the goal. Occasionally, during rugby games which attract low away support, the 5,400 capacity North Stand is closed altogether, and the away fans who attend are put into an alternative stand.

Attendances

Wigan Athletic F.C. 

Wigan Athletic's success has improved considerably since their move to the stadium from Springfield Park in 1999. The club subsequently climbed up two divisions to play in the Premier League from 2005 until 2013.

Rising success on the pitch has been met with increased attendances. Promotion into the Premier League meant that in their first season of English top-flight football, Wigan Athletic's average home attendance almost doubled from the season before. Over three times more fans attended matches at the stadium during Wigan's 2007–08 season in the Premier League than had attended in the 2001–02 season when Wigan Athletic were in the Football League Second Division. Wigan Athletic's average home attendance for 2007–08 was the lowest out of all 20 teams in the Premier League, failing to make the top 30 English clubs in terms of attendance. The same season saw the highest ever attendance at the stadium, when 25,133 people witnessed Wigan play Manchester United on the final day of the season.

Wigan Athletic's average attendance was again the lowest in the league for the Premier League 2008–09 season. Premier League attendances fell on average by around 426 per club during the 2008–09 season. Wigan Athletic's home attendance fell by more than this, with their average attendance for the 2008–09 season falling by 633 from the season before. The highest attendance at the stadium for this season was a match between Wigan Athletic and Arsenal F.C., in which 22,954 people were counted. This attendance was 2,357 fans lower than the highest attendance in the season before.

Wigan Warriors R.L.F.C.

Wigan Warriors moved from Central Park to the stadium in 1999 after the end of Super League IV's regular season. Since moving to the new stadium, Wigan Warriors' success in rugby league has not been as high as it was at their old Central Park ground, however the good times do seem to be back for the club after they won the Super League Grand Final and League Leaders shield in 2010 under the guidance of coach Michael Maguire and chairman Ian Lenagan.

Attendances have generally risen for the Wigan Warriors since the start of the 2002 season, averaging around 14,000 over the three seasons from 2006 to 2009. Aside from Grand Finals, the largest Super League attendance was recorded at the stadium in 2005 when Wigan Warriors played their local rivals, St Helens R.F.C.

This match is also the highest home attendance in the Wigan Warriors' history at the stadium. The twenty thousand mark has been broken ten times since moving to the new stadium in 1999—eight times against St Helens RLFC, once against local rivals Warrington Wolves in the opening round of the 2008 Super League XIII season, and once in July 2009 against the Leeds Rhinos following a campaign advertising the game as the 'Big One'. In 2010, the Warriors were officially the biggest supported team in the Super League.

Other events 

As well as the fixtures for the two domestic teams, the stadium is a venue for international rugby league. Since the stadium's construction in 1999, it has been an ever-present venue whenever International series have been played in England.

Its first involvement came during the 2004 series, where the home Great Britain and Ireland national team defeated the Australians 24–12, with Terry Newton and Andy Farrell both scoring in their home town of Wigan. The venue was again selected for the 2005 series, and again the match was between Great Britain and Australia—this time the home team lost 6–20—with Greater Manchester born Adrian Morley scoring Great Britain's solitary try. Both matches were complete sell-outs, each having attendances above 25,000. The match in 2004 was the third highest attendance of the series, coming behind a match at the City of Manchester Stadium between Great Britain and Australia, and the series final between the same two teams at Elland Road.

In addition to the Tri-Nations, the stadium has also played host to visiting nations during their European tours. Australia played Great Britain in front of a sell-out crowd during the 2001 Kangaroo tour, with the home side losing 8–28. Australia narrowly defeated Great Britain again in 2003 at the stadium, winning by a margin of four points during their 2003 European Tour. New Zealand have also played at the stadium during their tours. In 2002, a try scored in his home town by Martin Gleeson helped Great Britain to defeat the 'Kiwis' 16–10. The visitors lost again during their 2007 tour, this time 28–22 in a closely fought game in which Wigan-born  Sean O'Loughlin featured.

The stadium has hosted the World Club Challenge four times, in 2000, between St. Helens and the Melbourne Storm in 2011 when Wigan took on St. George Illawarra Dragons. and in 2015 and 2016 when Wigan Warriors hosted the Brisbane Broncos.

Rugby league test matches
Since its opening in 1999, it hosted six Great Britain internationals.

Since the Great Britain national rugby league team has split into individual home nations, it has hosted four England internationals.

Surroundings 

The stadium's surroundings are mostly urban, as it is located in the north of Wigan's Robin Park retail complex in the western suburb of Newtown, on the south bank of the River Douglas, west of the Miry Lane industrial estate. The stadium's car parks are situated around the canal, and can hold up to 2,500 cars.

Next to the stadium's South Stand lies the Robin Park Arena, which is operated by Wigan Sports Development Unit and is capable of seating 1,000 spectators. The arena is mainly used for athletics, as well as functions for: North West Counties Football League side Wigan Robin Park, and Wigan Athletic Reserves. The arena was formerly used by the Wigan Warriors' junior academy, before they moved to Edge Hall Road to join the reserve side. Robin Park Sports Centre is situated directly opposite the Stadium and Arena.

See also 

 List of English football stadia by capacity
 List of English rugby league stadia by capacity

Notes 

Wigan Warriors played one match in 1999 at the new stadium after moving from their former Central Park ground—an elimination play-off match against the Castleford Tigers.

Footnotes

References

External links 

 
Wigan Athletic
Wigan Warriors
Stadium Guide Article

Rugby league stadiums in England
Rugby League World Cup stadiums
Wigan Warriors
Sports venues in Greater Manchester
Football venues in England
Premier League venues
Buildings and structures in Wigan
Wigan Athletic F.C.
Sports venues completed in 1999
English Football League venues
1999 establishments in England
Sport in Wigan